The Swiss Men's Basketball Cup, commonly known as simply the Swiss Cup or as the Patrick Baumann Swiss Cup, is the national cup competition of professional basketball in Switzerland. It is organised by Swiss Basketball, the national governing body of the sport. It is the national federation cup of Switzerland.

Format
Teams from the top-tier levels in Switzerland can participate in the cup competition. A total number of 54 teams play a knock-out tournament, with a final at a neutral venue to determine the cup champions.

Finals

See also
 Swiss Basketball League (SBL)
 Swiss Basketball League Cup (League Cup)

References

Basketball competitions in Switzerland
Basketball cup competitions in Europe